Onychium may refer to:

Onychium (entomological journal)
Onychium (plant)